Andrew Tisch (born 1949) is the co-chair of Loews Corporation, the company founded by his father Larry Tisch and uncle Bob Tisch. 

Together with his brother, James S. Tisch, and his first cousin, Jonathan Tisch, Andrew oversees a holding company involved in hotels, oil, and insurance.

Early life and education
Tisch was born in 1949, the son of Wilma "Billie" (née Stein) and Laurence A. Tisch. Both his parents were of Jewish descent. He has three brothers: James S. Tisch (born 1953), Daniel Tisch (father of David Tisch), and Thomas Jonah Tisch. Tisch went to Suffield Academy in Suffield, Connecticut. He holds a B.S. degree from Cornell University (1971) and an M.B.A. from Harvard University (1977).

Career
Tisch worked for the family business, Loews Corporation, after school. He served as president of Bulova from 1979 to 1989; and in 1990, he was named chairman and chief executive officer of Lorillard Tobacco Company where he served until 1995. Testifying under oath before the US Congress in 1994, Tisch said, "I believe that nicotine is not addictive," and when asked whether he knew that cigarettes caused cancer, Tisch answered under oath, "I do not believe that." After the death of his father in 2003 and uncle in 2005, responsibility for the family business was put in the hands of Tisch, his brother, James S. Tisch, who served as CEO, and cousin, Jonathan Tisch,  who oversees the company's hotel business.

Family
Andrew's other first cousin — Jon's brother — is Steve Tisch, the movie mogul who produced Forrest Gump, Risky Business, and other big-budget Hollywood films, as well as co-owner of the National Football League's New York Giants. Andrew has two other brothers: Tom Tisch and Dan Tisch. Both own significant stakes in Loews Corp., but are not involved on a day-to-day basis.

Community service
Tisch is active in the City Parks Foundation (chairman), the Wildlife Conservation Society (trustee/secretary), and the New York City Police Foundation (trustee/executive committee). He is on the Dean's Board of Advisors at Harvard Business School, served as vice chairman of the Board of Trustees for Cornell University, and is a co-founder of the Young Women's Leadership Foundation. He served as the chairman of the Economic Club of New York, as a trustee for the Brookings Institution, and as a member of the Council on Foreign Relations. Andrew is active in Jewish communal affairs where he serves as a trustee for the American Jewish Joint Distribution Committee; is a founding chairman of the Jewish Leadership Forum; and as founder of the Jewish Business Leadership Forum.

Personal life
Andrew has been married twice:
Susan Hiat Tisch Allen who he has since divorced. They have a son, Alexander Hiat Tisch (born 1978) and a daughter Lacey Ann Tisch (born 1980). Both Lacey and Alexander were married by Susan Hiat's father, a rabbi, at the Central Synagogue in Manhattan. Susan's sister, Merryl Hiat, is married to Andrew's brother, James S. Tisch.  
Ann Rubenstein Tisch, a former reporter for NBC who co-founded an all-girls public school in Harlem.

References

Living people
American chairpersons of corporations
20th-century American Jews
Andrew
Harvard Business School alumni
American real estate businesspeople
Cornell University School of Hotel Administration alumni
1949 births
21st-century American Jews